

The Sikorsky S-31 was a 1920s American sesquiplane designed and built by the Sikorsky Manufacturing Corporation and configured for aerial photography.

Design and development
The S-31 was a sesquiplane built for photographic work by the Fairchild Flying Corporation. It had two open cockpits and a cabin for the photographic equipment. The S-31 was powered by a  Wright Whirlwind J-4 engine and first flew in September 1925. Following participation in the New York Air Races in October 1925 it was shipped to Brazil to be used by Fairchild for aerial photographic work. At some point the S-31 had twin Lewis machine guns ring-mounted on the rear cockpit.

Specifications

References

1920s United States civil utility aircraft
S-031
Sesquiplanes
Single-engined tractor aircraft
Aircraft first flown in 1925